Handball competitions at the 2015 Pan American Games in Toronto will be held from July 16 to 25 at the Direct Energy Centre (Exhibition Centre in Hall B). Due to naming rights the arena will be known as the latter for the duration of the games. A total of eight men's and women's teams will compete in each respective tournament.

The winners of the two tournaments will qualify for the 2016 Summer Olympics in Rio de Janeiro, Brazil. If the host nation, Brazil wins either tournament, the runner up will qualify instead.

Competition schedule

The following is the competition schedule for the handball competitions:

Medal summary

Medal table

Medalists

Qualification
A total of eight men's teams and eight women's team will qualify to compete at the games. The top three teams at the South American and Central American and Caribbean Games will qualify for each respective tournament. The host nation (Canada) automatically qualifies teams in both events. The United States and Uruguay competed against one another in a home/away playoff for the last spot in each tournament. The fourth placed team in the Central American and Caribbean Games both declined to compete in the respective tournaments. Each team can consist of up to 15 athletes.

Men

Women

Participating nations
A total of 9 countries have qualified athletes. The number of athletes a nation has entered is in parentheses beside the name of the country.

References

 
Events at the 2015 Pan American Games
2015
2015 in handball
International handball competitions hosted by Canada